The F-24 Sport Cruiser is an American trailerable trimaran that was designed by Ian Farrier as a cruising version of the Farrier F-24. It was first built in 1991.

Based on the larger F-27 Sport Cruiser, the F-24 Sport Cruiser design was developed into the Corsair 24 Mark II, also called the F-24 Mark II in 1994.

Production
The design was built by Corsair Marine in the United States, from 1991 to 1994, but it is now out of production.

Design
The F-24 Sport Cruiser is a recreational sailboat, built predominantly of vacuum bag molded fiberglass, Kevlar, carbon fiber over a foam core. It has a fractional sloop rig with a rotating mast. The hull and outriggers have nearly plumb stems and reverse transoms. The hull has an open transom, a transom-hung rudder controlled by a tiller and a retractable daggerboard. It displaces  and carries no ballast.

The design has sleeping accommodation for two adults and two children. The galley is equipped with a stove and a sink. A head is also provided.

See also
List of sailing boat types

References

Trimarans
1990s sailboat type designs
Sailing yachts
Trailer sailers
Sailboat type designs by Ian Farrier
Sailboat types built by Corsair Marine